What Noise is the second studio album by English synth-pop band Kissing the Pink, released in October 1984 by Magnet Records. It is the last Kissing the Pink album to feature founding members including saxophonist Josephine Wells, and violinist Peter Barnett. Second keyboardist George Stewart would also leave the band after this album but would later rejoin the band. The album features new addition, Simon Aldridge, who played guitar, and bass in the band. This album did not reach as much attention and was not as widespread as Kissing the Pink's other albums. It never held a worldwide release. It was their first album to make use of sampling.

34 years after its original release, What Noise was released on CD for the first time in 2018 by Cherry Red as a remastered special edition, which includes the 12 original album tracks plus seven related bonus tracks.

Track listing

Personnel
Credits are adapted from the What Noise liner notes.

Kissing the Pink
 Nicholas Whitecross – guitar; keyboards; vocals
 Jon Kingsley Hall – keyboards; synthesizer; vocals
 George Stewart – keyboards; vocals
 Simon Aldridge – guitar; bass; vocals
 Josephine Wells – saxophone; vocals
 Stevie Cusack –  drums; percussion; vocals
 Peter Barnett – violin; vocals

References

External links
 

1984 albums
Kissing the Pink albums